Driewegen may refer to:

 Driewegen, Borsele, a town in Zuid-Beveland, Zeeland, Netherlands
 Driewegen, Terneuzen, a town Zeelandic Flanders, Zeeland, Netherlands